Krasny Oktyabr is a rural locality (a settlement) in Ivanovskoye Rural Settlement, Kovrovsky District, Vladimir Oblast, Russia. The population was 944 as of 2010. There are 8 streets.

Geography 
Krasny Oktyabr is located 35 km south from Kovrov (the district's administrative centre) by road. Bedrino is the nearest rural locality.

References 

Rural localities in Kovrovsky District
Sudogodsky Uyezd